Anouar Ben Naceur (born August 22, 1983) is a Tunisian former swimmer, who specialized in freestyle events. He won a silver medal in the 400 m freestyle at the 2003 All-Africa Games in Abuja, Nigeria, placing second behind fellow Tunisian Oussama Mellouli with a time of 4:06.51.

Ben Naceur qualified for the men's 200 m freestyle at the 2004 Summer Olympics in Athens, by clearing a FINA B-standard entry time of 1:54.93 from the All-Africa Games in Abuja one year earlier. He challenged seven other swimmers in heat two, including dual citizen Mihail Alexandrov of Bulgaria. He edged out Singapore's Mark Chay in a close race for fourth seed by a hundredth of a second (0.01), posting his lifetime best of 1:54.69. Ben Naceur failed to advance into the semifinals, as he placed fiftieth overall in the preliminaries.

References

1983 births
Living people
Olympic swimmers of Tunisia
Swimmers at the 2004 Summer Olympics
Tunisian male freestyle swimmers
African Games silver medalists for Tunisia
African Games medalists in swimming
Competitors at the 2003 All-Africa Games
20th-century Tunisian people
21st-century Tunisian people